The common gamma chain (γc) (or CD132), also known as interleukin-2 receptor subunit gamma or IL-2RG, is a cytokine receptor sub-unit that is common to the receptor complexes for at least six different interleukin receptors: IL-2, IL-4, IL-7, IL-9, IL-15 and interleukin-21 receptor. The γc glycoprotein is a member of the type I cytokine receptor family expressed on most lymphocyte (white blood cell) populations, and its gene is found on the X-chromosome of mammals.

This protein is located on the surface of immature blood-forming cells in bone marrow. One end of the protein resides outside the cell where it binds to cytokines and the other end of the protein resides in the interior of the cell where it transmits signals to the cell's nucleus. The common gamma chain partners with other proteins to direct blood-forming cells to form lymphocytes (a type of white blood cell). The receptor also directs the growth and maturation of lymphocyte subtypes: T cells, B cells, and natural killer cells. These cells kill viruses, make antibodies, and help regulate the entire immune system.

Gene 
Cytokine receptor common subunit gamma also known as interleukin-2 receptor subunit gamma or IL-2RG is a protein that in humans is encoded by the IL2RG gene. The human IL2RG gene is located on the long (q) arm of the X chromosome at position 13.1, from base pair 70,110,279 to base pair 70,114,423.

Structure
The γc chain is an integral membrane protein that contains extracellular, transmembrane, and intracellular domains.

Function
Lymphocytes expressing the common gamma chain can form functional receptors for these cytokine proteins, which transmit signals from one cell to another and direct programs of cellular differentiation.

Ligands 
The γc chain partners with other ligand-specific receptors to direct lymphocytes to respond to cytokines including IL-2, IL-4, IL-7, IL-9, IL-15 and IL-21.

Signalling 

IL2RG has been shown to interact with Janus kinase 3.

Clinical significance

X-linked severe combined immunodeficiency 
X-linked severe combined immunodeficiency is caused by mutations in the IL2RG gene. More than 200 different mutations in the IL2RG gene have been identified in people with X-linked severe combined immunodeficiency (SCID). Most of these mutations involve changes in one or a few nucleotides (DNA building blocks) in the gene. These changes lead to the production of a nonfunctional version of the common gamma chain protein  or no production of protein. Without the common gamma chain, important chemical signals are not relayed to the nucleus and lymphocytes cannot develop normally. A lack of functional mature lymphocytes disrupts the immune system's ability to protect the body from infection. Affected people have no functional immunity and can die within months after birth without successful bone marrow transplantation or alternatively, isolation from exposure to pathogens. Without important developmental signals from IL-7 and IL-15, T-cell and NK cell populations respectively fail to develop.

Experiments in animal models have shown X-SCID to occur similarly in dogs, but not in mice.

Schizophrenia 

Alterations in the immune response are involved in pathogenesis of many neuropsychiatric disorders including schizophrenia. Distinct gene variants of a number of pro-inflammatory and chemotactic cytokines together with their receptors associate with this disorder. IL2RG represents an important signaling component of many interleukin receptors and so far, no data on the functional state of this receptor in schizophrenia have been reported. Over-expression of the IL2RG gene may be implicated in altered immune response in schizophrenia and contribute to the pathogenesis of this disorder.

References

Further reading

External links
 
 

Type I cytokine receptors
Immune system